Eric Konkol (born November 24, 1976) is an American college basketball coach and former player. He is the current head coach of the Tulsa Golden Hurricane men's basketball program.

Coaching career
On May 18, 2015, Konkol was named by Louisiana Tech as the 18th head coach of the Bulldogs basketball team. He replaced former head coach Mike White who accepted the head coaching position at the University of Florida.

Through seven seasons as head coach, Konkol had six seasons of more than 20 wins which is the most in Louisiana Tech men's basketball history.  He was the fastest to 50 wins in school history and is currently 4th on the all-time wins list. On March 21, 2022, Konkol was hired as head coach at Tulsa.

Head coaching record

 
 
 
 
 
 
 

1.Cancelled due to the Coronavirus Pandemic

Personal life
Konkol grew up in Amherst, Wisconsin. His brother, Brian, is the Dean of the Hendricks Chapel at Syracuse University.

References

External links
Louisiana Tech profile
Miami profile
George Mason profile

1970s births
Living people
American men's basketball coaches
American men's basketball players
Basketball coaches from Wisconsin
Basketball players from Wisconsin
College men's basketball head coaches in the United States
George Mason Patriots men's basketball coaches
High school basketball coaches in the United States
Louisiana Tech Bulldogs basketball coaches
Miami Hurricanes men's basketball coaches
Tennessee Volunteers basketball coaches
Tulsa Golden Hurricane men's basketball coaches
Wisconsin–Eau Claire Blugolds men's basketball players
Wisconsin–Platteville Pioneers men's basketball players